Annika Ekdahl (born 1955 in Stockholm, Sweden) is a textile artist who designs tapestries marrying Renaissance and Baroque practice with more modern techniques, creating large-scale works in her own contemporary style. She has exhibited in Europe and Australia and was the 2013 Nordic Textiles Awardee.

Biography
Annika Ekdahl was born in 1955 in Stockholm, Sweden where she spent her childhood. From 1978, she developed an interest in working with textiles.  In the early 1980s, she moved to Blekinge and obtained a master's degree in textile art in 1994 from the HDK School of Design and Crafts of the University of Gothenburg. She was a lecturer at Blekinge Institute of Technology (2002–08) and an adjunct professor at HDK (2008–11).

Ekdahl's preferred art form is tapestry design. Having studied Renaissance methods, she employs classical techniques to create large-scale works depicting people and situations from her own life. Her works can take up to one and one-half years to complete as she weaves contemporary imagery of animals, people, places into her narrative designs. She describes the process as much like writing a novel, weaving the story with traditional methods but utilizing a modern approach including digital techniques.

Between 2000 and 2006, she worked on five pieces creating a series she called The Baroque Party. The works were included in an exhibition which was displayed in Kalmar Castle, Ronneby Cultural Center, Västerås Art Museum and Dalslands Museum of Art. Ekdahl has traveled through Europe studying tapestries, visited Poland to study the world-famous Wawel Castle tapestries in Kraków and worked in Australia where she has exhibited at the Maitland Art Gallery in New South Wales.

In February 2013 at the Abecita Art Museum in Borås, Ekdahl received the Nordic Award in Textiles, an honor that granted her not only a substantial monetary award, but also earned her a visiting professorship at University of Gothenburg. The same year in November, she was awarded the prestigious Prince Eugen Medal for her outstanding tapestries. In 2015 she unveiled the two tapestries she has been making since the award, Follow Me. Shine, which is about discovery and perception and Follow Me. Grow, about growth and development. They were both installed at the University of Oslo in 2015.

References

External links
Annika Ekdahl's website with illustrations of her work

1955 births
Living people
Swedish textile artists
Swedish weavers
Recipients of the Prince Eugen Medal
Swedish women artists
Women textile artists